The following is a list of notable events and releases of the year 2002 in Norwegian music.

Events

January
 18 – The 21st annual Djangofestival started on Cosmopolite in Oslo, Norway (January 18 – 19).
 25 – The 5th Polarjazz started in Longyearbyen, Svalbard (January 25 – 27).

February
 1 – Kristiansund Opera Festival opened (February 1 – 16).

March
 13 – The annual By:Larm started in Trondheim, Norway (March 13 – 16).
 22 – The 29th Vossajazz started in Voss, Norway (March 22 – 24).

April
 30 –  Ole Blues started in Bergen (April 30 – May 4).

May
 5 – The 13th MaiJazz started in Stavanger, Norway (May 6 – 10).
 24
The start of Bergen International Music Festival Festspillene i Bergen (May 24 – June 2).
 The 30th Nattjazz started in Bergen, Norway (May 24 – June 1).

June
 14 – Norwegian Wood started in Oslo, Norway (June 14 – 16).

July
 3 – The 38th Kongsberg Jazzfestival started in Kongsberg, Norway (July 3 – 6).
 15 – The 42nd Moldejazz started in Molde, Norway (July 15 – 20).

August
 5 – The 17th Oslo Jazzfestival started in Oslo, Norway (August 5 – 10).
 7 
 The annual Øyafestivalen started in Oslo, Norway (August 7 – 10).
 The 16th Sildajazz started in Haugesund, Norway (August 7 – 11).
 21 – The 1st Insomnia Festival started in Tromsø (August 21 – 24).

September
 20 – The Bergen International Chamber Music Festival started in Bergen, Norway (September 20 – 28.

Oktober
 3 – Ultima Oslo Contemporary Music Festival started in Oslo, Norway (Oktober 3 – 13).
 10 – The DølaJazz started in Lillehammer, Norway (Oktober 10 – 13).

November
 1 – The Trondheim Jazz Festival started in Trondheim, Norway (November 1 – 3).
 5 – Oslo World Music Festival started in Oslo, Norway (November 5 – 11).

December 
  11 – The Nobel Peace Prize Concert was held in Oslo Spektrum.

Unknown date 
 Susanna Mälkki was in the autumn appointed as chief conductor for Stavanger Symphony Orchestra (2002–2005). The Finnish conductor was engaged for three years, and succeeded Ole Kristian Ruud(1999–2002).

Albums released

May

November

Unknown date

I
 Terje Isungset
 Iceman Is (Jazzland Recordings)

G
 Frode Gjerstad
 Shadows And Light (FMR Records), with Terje Isungset

Births 

 May
 12 – Birgitta Elisa Oftestad, classical cellist.

Deaths 

 February
 1 – Sigurd Berge, composer (born 1929).

 March
 19 – Egil Storbekken, traditional folk musician flautist, and composer (born 1911).

 May
 6 – Bjørn Johansen, jazz saxophonist (born 1940).

 June 
 18 – Stein Ove Berg, singer and songwriter (born 1948).

See also
 2002 in Norway
 Music of Norway
 Norway in the Eurovision Song Contest 2002
 2002 in jazz

References

 
Norwegian music
Norwegian
Music
2000s in Norwegian music